Hamid Farooq Durrani (born in Pakistan) is a Pakistani Jurist and Lawyer. He is the current Chairman of the Khyber Pakhtunkhwa Services Tribunal. He was appointed Chairman of KP Tribunal in November 2018. He was formerly a Judge at the  Peshawar High Court. Durrani was also the Chief Ehtesab Commissioner at KP Ehtesab Commission till his appointment into the tribunal in 2018.

References 

Living people
Judges of the Islamabad High Court
Judges of the Peshawar High Court
Year of birth missing (living people)